Ludwig Kretz is an Austrian former cyclist. He won the Austrian National Road Race Championships in 1975.

References

External links
 

Year of birth missing (living people)
Living people
Austrian male cyclists
Place of birth missing (living people)
20th-century Austrian people